Alander Mountain is a  prominent peak of the south Taconic Mountains; it is located in  southwest Massachusetts and adjacent New York. Part of the summit is grassy and open and part is covered with scrub oak and shrubs; the sides of the mountain are wooded with northern hardwood tree species. Views from the top include the southern Taconic Mountains, the Hudson River Valley including the Catskills. Several trails traverse Alander Mountain, most notably the  South Taconic Trail, which passes just beneath the summit.

Much of the mountain is located within Taconic State Park and Mount Washington State Forest; other parcels have been conserved by non-profit organizations. Primitive camping is allowed on Alander Mountain; a cabin is located near the summit and there are two hike-in campsites on the east slope within Mount Washington State Forest.

The west slope of Alander Mountain is located within Copake, New York. The summit and east side are within the town of Mount Washington, Massachusetts. The west side of Alander Mountain drains into the Preachy Hill Brook, then into the Noster Kill, Bash Bish Brook, the Roeliff Jansen Kill, thence the Hudson River and Long Island Sound. The east side drains into Ashley Hill Brook, then Bash Bish Brook and the Roeliff Jansen Kill.

History
In 1926, New York State's Conservation Commission received a request for information regarding its fire observation stations from the Taconic State Park Commission (TSPC). The TSPC felt that a station on Alander Mountain would be of great assistance to the fire protective organization, not just within the park, but also on large areas outside the Park. In early 1927 Conservation Department rangers supervised the erection a  Aermotor LS40 Aermotor steel fire lookout tower on the mountain. Approximately  of telephone line was constructed to connect the tower with the New York telephone system. Initially, the tower was intended for spotting fires in the park, but later on, arrangements were made with the TSPC so that fires on State land or private land outside the park would be reported as well. In August 1930, the Conservation Commission received a notice from Mr. William A. Miles of Salisbury, Connecticut that he was terminating the lease to the part of his property being used as the site for the tower. In response, the park had the tower dismantled by the end of the year.

The parts were placed in storage at High Valley Farm, the home of then-Commissioner Francis R. Masters until it was decided where the tower would be rebuilt. In 1932, the Conservation Department agreed to accept a transfer of the tower from the TSPC. In late 1932, the tower was rebuilt on private lands on Washburn Mountain and became operational in 1933. The tower remained on Washburn Mountain until 1964 when it was moved to Beebe Hill, where it still remains today.

See also

 List of mountains in Massachusetts
 List of old growth forests in Massachusetts

References
 Massachusetts Trail Guide (2004). Boston: Appalachian Mountain Club.
 Commonwealth Connections proposal PDF download. Retrieved March 2, 2008.

References

External links
 South Taconic Range trail map.
 Mount Washington State Forest. Massachusetts DCR.
 Mount Washington State Forest map
 Taconic State Park New York DEC.
 Berkshire Natural Resource Council
 Berkshire Chapter of the Appalachian Mountain Club
 Mid-Hudson chapter of the Adirondack Mountain Club
 New York - New Jersey Trail Conference
 The Sierra Club

Mountains of Columbia County, New York
Taconic Mountains
Mountains of Berkshire County, Massachusetts
Mountains of New York (state)